Love at Second Sight is a 2014 Chinese drama starring Zheng Kai, Rainie Yang and Michael Zhang. Filming began on 20 February 2014 and wrapped in end of April. It was filmed on Zhengzhou, China.

Cast

Main cast

Supporting Cast

Soundtrack

Reception

International broadcast
 It began airing in Vietnam from November 27, 2016 on VTV3 under the title Không phải tiếng sét ái tình.

References

External links
  Love at Second Sight weibo on weibo.com

Chinese romance television series
2014 Chinese television series debuts
2014 Chinese television series endings